Parliamentary elections were held in Portugal on 19 August 1906, the second that year and the fourth in three years. For the first time in several decades no party won an overall majority, with the Liberal Regenerator Party emerging as the largest party with 65 seats.

Results

The results exclude seats from overseas territories.

References

Legislative elections in Portugal
1906 elections in Europe
1906 elections in Portugal
August 1906 events